The 1954 NBA draft was the eighth annual draft of the National Basketball Association (NBA). The draft was held on April 24, 1954, before the 1954–55 season. In this draft, nine NBA teams took turns selecting amateur U.S. college basketball players. In each round, the teams select in reverse order of their win–loss record in the previous season. The draft consisted of 13 rounds comprising 100 players selected.

Draft selections and draftee career notes
Frank Selvy from Furman University was selected first overall by the Baltimore Bullets. Second pick of the draft, Bob Pettit from Louisiana State University, have been inducted to the Basketball Hall of Fame. Pettit also won the Rookie of the Year Award in his first season.

Key

Draft

Other picks
The following list includes other draft picks who have appeared in at least one NBA game.

Notable undrafted players
These players were not selected in the 1954 draft but played at least one game in the NBA.

See also
 List of first overall NBA draft picks

References
General

Specific

External links
NBA.com
NBA.com: NBA Draft History

Draft
National Basketball Association draft
NBA draft
NBA draft
Basketball in New York City
Sporting events in New York City